Ladda granites is a species of butterfly in the family Hesperiidae. It is found in Ecuador and Bolivia.

Subspecies
Ladda granites granites - Ecuador
Ladda granites privata Draudt, 1923 - Bolivia

References

Butterflies described in 1898
Hesperiidae of South America
Taxa named by Paul Mabille